Pravesh Mallick (Nepali: प्रवेश मल्लिक), born on 1 July 1980, is a Bollywood composer, songwriter and playback singer of Nepali origin. After working as a stage performer and composing for non-film albums and songs he debuted as a film playback singer and composer in Prakash Jha's 2016 Hindi film Jai Gangaajal. Maya Thagni is an uplifting and motivational track that features Priyanka Chopra is seen bashing goons who harass innocent villagers and break the law and is beautifully sung by Pravesh Mallick. Mallick, a follower of Padma Shri Pandit Madhup Mudgal, is a lead singer and founder of Sufi rock fusion band ‘Sanidhya’. He has been working as a composer-singer and music teacher for the last 12 years.

Pravesh has also performed live in different parts of India and abroad, UK/US/Belgium.

Early life and education
Pravesh was born in Janakpur, Nepal, into a Maithil family. 
 
Pravesh learned his first note of music from his mother Sushila Mallick through Maithili Lullabies. Pravesh began his early musical training under Pandit Laxmi Narayan Das, Pandit Shiv Lal, Pandit Ram Bihar with MINAP (Mithila Natya Kala Parishad) a cultural institution of Mithila situated. Pravesh moved to New Delhi with his brother Ramesh Mallick for higher training in Hindustani classical music and obtained admission into the prestigious Gandharva Mahavidyalaya, New Delhi.  Here he learned classical vocal music under teachers such as I.S. Bawra, Sujit Ojha, Sudhanshu Bahuguna. Finally, he was noticed by pandit Madhup Mudgal and had the opportunity to learn different aspects of music under his guidance and also started to perform with the Gandharva Choir in India and abroad.

Pravesh is Sangeet Shiromani Diploma holder and has a master's degree in Hindustani classical music from Delhi University and BscIT from SMU in Delhi. Mallick is married to Amrita Karn Mallick and has one child, Parth Mallick.

Music career
Pravesh started teaching music in Step by Step World School, Noida. He formed a choral music group Sparsh and performed in various parts of India. Later, his interest in music by Nusrat Fateh Ali Khan, A. R. Rahman and others led him to form a band named Sanidhya.  It performs Sufi, folk, Classical fusion with his own composition. Pravesh also continues with his recording interest by releasing cassettes in different languages like Maithili, Nepali, Hindi, Punjabi and composing music for regional movies and theater productions. Some of his popular albums in Maithili are Geet Ghar Ghar Ke, Chaura Tora Bazzar Khastau, Lehuaayal Aanchar, Khota Shingaar.

He got his first major break in Prakash Jha's film Jai Gangaajal on which he worked with Salim–Sulaiman and sung a Maya Thagni song in his rustic and raw vocals.

Discography

Films

References

External links
 Sanidhya Band official Website
 New version of Vandey Matram by Pravesh Mallick
 Maya Thagni from Jai Gangaajal
 Jogiya, a sufi song
 

1980 births
21st-century classical composers
Bollywood playback singers
Hindi film score composers
Indian male singer-songwriters
Indian singer-songwriters
Living people
People from Janakpur
Nepalese musicians
Singers from Bihar
Male film score composers
21st-century Indian male singers
21st-century Indian singers
Nepalese film score composers